Noé Lebreton (born 22 April 2004) is a French professional footballer who plays as a defensive midfielder for the club Stade Malherbe Caen.

Career
Lebreton is a youth product of Avranches and Caen, and was promoted to Caen's reserves in 2021. He made his professional debut with Caen in a 2–1 Ligue 2 loss to Rodez AF on 14 May 2022. On 8 July 2022, he signed his first professional contract with Caen.

Personal life
Lebreton was born in France to a French father and a Senegalese mother.

References

External links
 
 Ligue 2 profile

2004 births
Living people
Sportspeople from Manche
French footballers
French sportspeople of Senegalese descent
Association football midfielders
Ligue 2 players
Championnat National 2 players
Stade Malherbe Caen players